George Foster Shepley (January 1, 1819 – July 20, 1878) was an officer in the Union Army during the American Civil War, military governor of Louisiana and a United States circuit judge of the United States Circuit Courts for the First Circuit.

Education and career

Born on January 1, 1819, in Saco, Maine, Shepley attended Harvard University, received an Artium Baccalaureus degree in 1837 from Dartmouth College and read law in 1839. He entered private practice in Bangor, Maine from 1839 to 1844. He continued private practice in Portland, Maine from 1844 to 1861. He served as the United States Attorney for the District of Maine from 1848 to 1849 and from 1853 to 1861. He served as a Brigadier General in the United States Army during the American Civil War from 1861 to 1865. He resumed private practice in Portland from 1865 to 1866. He was a member of the Maine House of Representatives from 1866 to 1867. He again resumed private practice in Portland from 1867 to 1869.

Civil War service

Shepley was commissioned a Colonel of the 12th Maine Infantry on November 16, 1861. He was assigned to the Department of the Gulf, commanding a brigade during the New Orleans campaign from April 18, 1862, to May 1, 1862. He served as military governor of New Orleans, Louisiana from May 1862 to July 1862, and then served as military governor of the Union-occupied parishes of Louisiana until March 1864. He was appointed Brigadier General of Volunteers on July 18, 1862. He briefly headed a district in Virginia and then served as chief of staff of XXV Corps, in the Army of the James. He then served as military governor of Richmond, Virginia from April 3, 1865, to July 1, 1865, when he resigned his military commission to return to private practice.

Federal judicial service

He was confirmed by the United States Senate on December 22, 1869, and received his commission the same day. His service terminated on July 20, 1878, due to his death in Portland. He was interred at Evergreen Cemetery in Portland. His tombstone has his birth date as January 1, 1819.

See also
 List of American Civil War generals (Union)

References

Sources
 State of Louisiana – Biography
 Cemetery Memorial by La-Cemeteries

External links
 
 George Foster Shepley Writ of Election at The Historic New Orleans Collection

1819 births
1878 deaths
19th-century American judges
Burials at Evergreen Cemetery (Portland, Maine)
Democratic Party governors of Louisiana
Governors of Louisiana
Harvard Law School alumni
Judges of the United States circuit courts
Mayors of New Orleans
People from Saco, Maine
People of Louisiana in the American Civil War
People of Maine in the American Civil War
Politicians from Bangor, Maine
Politicians from Portland, Maine
Union Army generals
United States Attorneys for the District of Maine
United States federal judges appointed by Ulysses S. Grant
United States federal judges admitted to the practice of law by reading law